Gabriel Omar Amato (born 22 October 1970) is an Argentine retired footballer who played as a striker.

Football career
Born in Mar del Plata, Buenos Aires Province, Amato began his senior career with local Club Atlético Aldosivi. In his first seven seasons as a professional he represented six clubs, also wearing the shirts of Club de Gimnasia y Esgrima La Plata, Boca Juniors, Club Atlético Independiente, Club Atlético Huracán and Club Atlético River Plate. 

In 1996, Amato moved to Spain where he would remain for the better part of following eight years: he started with Hércules CF, but only scored twice in more than 2,000 minutes of action as his club was relegated from La Liga.

Amato joined RCD Mallorca for the 1997–98 campaign, sharing teams with countrymen Héctor Cúper (manager), Óscar Mena and Carlos Roa as the team – freshly promoted to the top level – overachieved for a final third position in the league table with him as its top scorer. The Balearic Islands side also reached the final of the Copa del Rey against FC Barcelona, where he assisted Jovan Stanković in the 1–1 equalizer and also converted his penalty shootout attempt, but in an eventual loss.

In-between his stint in the country, Amato spent two seasons in the Scottish Premier League with Rangers, signing for £4.2 million. In his first competitive game for Rangers, a remarkable UEFA Cup tie away to League of Ireland side Shelbourne (although played at Tranmere Rovers' Prenton Park), Amato marked his debut by scoring twice as Rangers came back from 3–0 down to win the match 5–3. He netted 13 times in 45 official contests during his time with the club, winning the title on both occasions and adding the 1999 edition of the Scottish Cup; on 15 May 1999 he scored a hat-trick in a 5–1 away routing of Motherwell, one of the goals coming through a penalty.

After one year in Brazil with Grêmio Foot-Ball Porto Alegrense, Amato played a further three 1/2 seasons in Spain. Midway through 2003–04 he left Albacete Balompié and joined Club Atlético Banfield, retiring shortly after at the age of 34.

References

External links

1970 births
Living people
Sportspeople from Mar del Plata
Argentine people of Italian descent
Argentine footballers
Association football forwards
Argentine Primera División players
Aldosivi footballers
Club de Gimnasia y Esgrima La Plata footballers
Boca Juniors footballers
Club Atlético Independiente footballers
Club Atlético Huracán footballers
Club Atlético River Plate footballers
Club Atlético Banfield footballers
La Liga players
Segunda División players
Hércules CF players
RCD Mallorca players
Real Betis players
Levante UD footballers
Albacete Balompié players
Scottish Premier League players
Rangers F.C. players
Campeonato Brasileiro Série A players
Grêmio Foot-Ball Porto Alegrense players
Argentine expatriate footballers
Expatriate footballers in Spain
Expatriate footballers in Scotland
Expatriate footballers in Brazil
Argentine expatriate sportspeople in Spain
Argentine expatriate sportspeople in Scotland
Argentine expatriate sportspeople in Brazil